Uladzislau Litvinau (born 7 January 2000) is a Belarusian canoeist. He competed in the men's K-4 500 metres event at the 2020 Summer Olympics.

References

External links
 

2000 births
Living people
Belarusian male canoeists
Olympic canoeists of Belarus
Canoeists at the 2020 Summer Olympics
Place of birth missing (living people)
European Games competitors for Belarus
Canoeists at the 2019 European Games